Please Teach Me English (lit. "The Complete Mastering of English") is a 2003 South Korean comedy about a young woman who begins English lessons after she is unable to help a foreigner at her government office.

Synopsis
Park Mun-su (Jang Hyuk) and Na Young-ju (Lee Na-young) are classmates in a private English class. Mun-su frequently chases women while working in his shoe shop. However, Young-ju has an unreciprocated interest in him. They eventually become friends, and frequently sit together in class.

One day, Young-ju boasts about a pig on her grandparents' farm who can recognize the English alphabet. The class decide to visit the pig, only to discover it has been eaten the same day and Young-ju just invented the whole story. Young-ju tries to train a piglet to recognize the alphabet; and when Mun-su finds out about her efforts, he tries to help her. However, the pig escapes, and has to be recaptured. The class and Young-ju's family have a party that night.

One day, while riding the bus, Young-ju catches Mun-su showing the photo of a woman who she mistakenly believes to be his girlfriend. Discouraged by this, Young-ju skips English classes. Her teacher, an Australian woman, tries to convince her to return to the classes. Young-ju attends a farewell party for the class, but Mun-su is not there. Afterwards she meets Mun-su's mother, who is looking for him. She discovers that his mother is about to meet the girl in the photo.

The girl, known as Victoria or Mun-young, speaks no Korean and needs Young-ju to translate. Dressed in a hanbok, Mun-su's mother and talking to Victoria, Young-ju, who thinks Victoria is her rival, purposefully translates incorrectly telling Victoria; "You looked more beautiful in the photo." Victoria is astonished. Young-ju tells Victoria that everybody hates her because she is not Korean. Victoria asks her to tell Mun-su's mother that she came with good intentions and leaves. Mun-su arrives to find his mother weeping. Young-ju hides. Victoria has checked out of the hotel, but Young-ju stops her car, and admits that she lied. Victoria reunites with Mun-su and his mother. Ashamed, Young-ju boards a train but Mun-su follows her, leaving his family behind. She tries to hide from him, but Mun-su finds Young-ju, loudly confessing to her that Victoria is not his girlfriend, but his long-lost sister from New York. They make up, kissing in the train, with the entire train cheering them on. They marry and have a baby.

Cast

Lee Na-young as Na Young-ju
Jang Hyuk as Park Mun-su
Angela Kelly as Catherine
Na Moon-hee as Mun-su's mother
Kim Yong-gun as Young-ju's father
Kim Young-ae as Young-ju's mother
Kim In-moon as Young-ju's grandfather
Moon Mi-bong as Young-ju's grandmother
Jung Sang-hoon as Young-ju's younger brother
Lee Chang-hwan as Richard
Baek Ye-young as Julie
Jung Suk-yong as Tyson
Hwang Hyo-eun as Betty
Choi Joo-bong as Chief of district office
Kang Nam-young as Bo-kyeong
Lee So-eun as Mun-young
Kim Sun-hwa as Madam
Jo Jae-yoon as Manager Hong
Jang Ji-soo as Miss Lee
Yoo Hae-jin as Subway passenger (cameo)
Lee Beom-soo as Subway passenger (cameo)
Jung Doo-hong as Terrorist (cameo)
Kim In-kwon as Sergeant (cameo)

References

External links
   
 
 
 

2003 films
2000s Korean-language films
South Korean romantic comedy films
2003 romantic comedy films
Films about language
2000s English-language films
2000s South Korean films
2003 multilingual films
South Korean multilingual films